Milaq (also Romanized as Mīlāq, Milagh, and Meylāq; also known as Chāy Mīlāq and Mīlāq-i-Sufla) is a village in Kharaqan-e Sharqi Rural District, Abgarm District, Avaj County, Qazvin Province, Iran. At the 2006 census, its population was 63, in 13 families.

References 

Populated places in Avaj County